Christopher James Brown (born February 3, 1991) is an American professional ice hockey center. He is currently an unrestricted free agent who most recently played under contract for the Iserlohn Roosters of the Deutsche Eishockey Liga (DEL). Brown was drafted by the Phoenix Coyotes in the second round (36th overall) of the 2009 NHL Entry Draft.

Playing career
As a youth, Brown played in the 2003 Quebec International Pee-Wee Hockey Tournament with the Dallas Storm minor ice hockey team.  He grew up in Flower Mound, Texas where he played hockey and football for Flower Mound High School. He eventually joined the U.S. National Team Development Program from which he then accepted a scholarship to play college hockey with the University of Michigan Wolverines of the Central Collegiate Hockey Association (CCHA). In his first season with the Wolverines, he was selected to the 2009–10 CCHA All-Rookie Team.

On the eve of the 2013–14 NHL trade deadline, Brown was dealt by the Coyotes along with Rostislav Klesla and a fourth-round pick in 2015 NHL Entry Draft to the Washington Capitals in exchange for Martin Erat and John Mitchell on March 4, 2014. Brown scored his first NHL goal with the Capitals on March 22, 2014, against Antti Niemi of the San Jose Sharks.

Brown was dealt once again on the eve of the 2015–16 trade deadline. He was traded by the Capitals to the New York Rangers in exchange for fellow American Ryan Bourque. On April 20, 2016, Brown was recalled by the New York Rangers from the team's AHL affiliate, the Hartford Wolf Pack.

After parts of two seasons with the Wolf Pack, Brown left North America at the conclusion of his contract with the Rangers, signing a one-year deal with German outfit, the Iserlohn Roosters of the DEL on July 19, 2017. In the 2017–18 season, Brown was looked upon to add production and posted 21 assists and 30 points in 47 games.

On May 8, 2018, Brown signed as a free agent with fellow DEL club, the Thomas Sabo Ice Tigers, on a two-year contract.

Following four seasons with the Ice Tigers, Brown returned as a free agent to his original German club, Iserlohn Roosters, signing a one-year contract on June 22, 2022. In his second stint with the Roosters in 2022–23, Brown notched 22 points through 50 regular season games. With Iserlohn missing the playoffs for the second consecutive season, he left the club at the conclusion of his contract on March 10, 2023.

Career statistics

Regular season and playoffs

International

Awards and honors

References

External links

1991 births
American men's ice hockey centers
Arizona Coyotes draft picks
Hartford Wolf Pack players
Hershey Bears players
Ice hockey people from Texas
Iserlohn Roosters players
Living people
Michigan Wolverines men's ice hockey players
Nürnberg Ice Tigers players
People from Flower Mound, Texas
Phoenix Coyotes players
Portland Pirates players
Thomas Sabo Ice Tigers players
USA Hockey National Team Development Program players
Washington Capitals players